Son Goku was a German rock band who played a mix of hardcore punk, alternative, reggae, and electronic sounds. The band was named after the Son Goku character in the Dragon Ball series. Son Goku's first and only album, Crashkurs (Crash course), was released in 2002 and reached a peak position of 15 on the Media Control Charts. The group has since disbanded due to "dissension" amongst the members.

History

Origins
Son Goku was a side project of Thomas D of Die Fantastischen Vier. The band originated from the M.A.R.S. (Moderne Anstalt Rigoroser Spakker, or Modern Institute of Adamant Spakkers), a commune of artists and musicians founded by Thomas D in 1998. Thomas D named the band after Son Goku, the protagonist of the Dragon Ball animated series, as the character embodied the band's philosophy; he stated he was "fascinated by Goku's naïveté and cheerfulness, yet, at the same time, a great warrior saving the world".

Music
Son Goku was formed with the "desire for a new form of expression and a fresh sound", resulting in a mix of hardcore punk, alternative, reggae, and electronic sounds. Established band members and access to their own recording studio at the M.A.R.S. commune allowed for experimentation with the genres.

Son Goku's only single, "Alle für jeden", was released on 17 June 2002, followed by the album Crashkurs on 29 July 2002.

Son Goku disbanded on or before 1 January 2003, due to 'dissension' amongst the members.

Band members

Thomas D 

Thomas D is best known as a member of the German hip hop group Die Fantastischen Vier. He had also undertaken previous solo projects. Son Goku was the first in which he did not rap. Thomas D founded Son Goku with Bertil Mark and provided vocals and lyrics for the band. Or Born In 2014

Komi Togbonou
Komi Togbonou had played in the band Gajanaut and provided vocals and played digeridoo for Nina Hagen, Die Fantastischen Vier und Thomas D in both studio and concert settings. Togbonou provided vocals and lyrics for Son Goku.

Bertil Mark
Bertil Mark was born in 1976 and had his first performance experience in a youth theater production of Joseph and the Amazing Technicolor Dreamcoat. Mark had worked with other German bands including, among others, 5 Sterne Deluxe and Fettes Brot.  Since 1999, Mark had been producing for his own studio, Haus Erika Productions, and for the M.A.R.S. commune.  Mark was Son Goku's drummer and producer.

Axel Hilgenstöhler
Axel Hilgenstöhler was the guitarist of "Thumb" for 7 years and was involved in production and songwriting for Clueso, MC Lenny, Ferris MC, Tyree Cooper, Tyrone Rickets, Virginia Nasiamento and Africa Islam.  Hilgenstöhler had also toured with bands such as Henry Rollins, The Prodigy, Foo Fighters, and Bad Religion.  Hilgenstöhler was a guitarist and producer for Son Goku

Jochen Hornung
Since 1999, Jochen Hornung has been a guitarist in several hardcore bands, most notably "Beat Down". Hornung has also been a columnist for Zap Magazine, a concert presenter and run his own record label. Hornung met Thomas D through his work with Die Fantastischen Vier.

Paul J Greco
Born in 1966, Paul Greco toured worldwide as part of Chumbawamba from 1992 to 1999. Since 2000, Greco had been doing studio work in Germany with Clueso, Arj Snoek and Klaus Cornfield. Greco was the bassist for Son Goku.

Discography

Crashkurs 
Crashkurs (Crash course) is Son Goku's first and only studio album. The album took six months to prepare and, of the approximately 16 to 18 songs written, 14 were chosen. The album peaked at number 15 on the Media Control Charts (official German music charts) and 35 on Austrian charts.

"Alle für jeden" 
"Alle für jeden" (Everyone for all) is Son Goku's first and only single. The single peaked at number 86 on the Media Control Charts.

See also
German hip hop
Music of Germany

References

German musical groups
German punk rock groups
Musical groups established in 2002
2002 establishments in Germany